"Around the World" is the fourth single released by Ami Suzuki under the record label, Avex Trax.

Unlike her previous three singles, "Around the World" is a special limited edition single that only had 10,000 copies available for sale and only came in the CD format. It was released on the same day as her first album under Avex and also shared the same name. The single also contained a special photobook. As this single wasn't released in CD+DVD format, the music of "Around the World" was only available in the album.

The single includes a remixed version of song "Times", b-side originally included in "Negaigoto" single. Both tracks are dance tunes.

Track listing

Personnel
Ami Suzuki - vocals, backing vocals

Production
Producer - Max Matsuura

Live performances
14 October 2005 — Music Fighter
17 October 2005 — Hey!Hey!Hey! Music Champ
22 October 2005 — CD:TV
28 October 2005 — Music Station
28 October 2005 — PopJam
29 October 2005 — Melodix
17 December 2005 — Japan Cable Awards (Nihon Yusen Taisyo) 2005
31 December 2005 — 47th Japan Record Awards - "Eventful" and "Around the World"

Charts
Oricon Sales Chart (Japan)

Ami Suzuki songs
2005 singles
Song recordings produced by Max Matsuura
2005 songs
Songs written by Ami Suzuki
Avex Trax singles